Dame Harriet Mary Walter  (born 24 September 1950) is a British actress. She has received a Laurence Olivier Award as well as numerous nominations including for a Tony Award, three Primetime Emmy Awards, and a Screen Actors Guild Award. In 2011, she was appointed Dame Commander of the Order of the British Empire (DBE) for services to drama.

Walter began her career in 1974 and made her Broadway debut in 1983. For her work in various Royal Shakespeare Company productions, including Twelfth Night (1987–88) and Three Sisters (1988), she won the 1988 Olivier Award for Best Actress in a Revival. Her other notable work for the RSC includes leading roles in Macbeth (1999) and Antony and Cleopatra (2006). She won the Evening Standard Award for Best Actress for her role as Elizabeth I in the 2005 London revival of Mary Stuart, and received a Tony Award nomination for Best Actress in a Play when she reprised the role on Broadway in 2009. She reprised her roles of Brutus in Julius Caesar (2012) and the title role in Henry IV (2014), as well as playing Prospero in The Tempest, as part of an all-female Shakespeare trilogy in 2016.

Walter’s film appearances include Sense and Sensibility (1995), The Governess (1998), Villa des Roses (2002), Atonement (2007), The Young Victoria (2009), A Royal Affair (2012), Star Wars: The Force Awakens (2015), Denial (2016), The Sense of an Ending (2017), Rocketman (2019) and Ridley Scott's The Last Duel (2021). On television she starred as Harriet Vane in the 1987 BBC Wimsey dramatisations, as Natalie Chandler in the ITV drama series Law & Order: UK (2009–14), in four episodes of Downton Abbey (2013–15), in the miniseries London Spy (2015), as Clementine Churchill in The Crown (2016), in Patrick Melrose (2018), and in the third season of Killing Eve (2020). She is a three-time Primetime Emmy Award nominee; two for Outstanding Guest Actress in a Drama Series for Succession (2018–21) and one for Outstanding Guest Actress in a Comedy Series for Ted Lasso (2021).

Early life 
Walter was born in London, England. She is the niece of British actor Sir Christopher Lee, being the daughter of his elder sister Xandra Lee. On her father's side, she is a great-great-great-granddaughter of John Walter, founder of The Times. She was educated at Cranborne Chase School. After turning down a university education, she was in turn rejected by five different drama schools before being admitted to the London Academy of Music and Dramatic Art. Following her training she gained early experience with the Joint Stock Theatre Company, Paines Plough touring, and the Duke's Playhouse, Lancaster.

Career 
She has worked many times throughout her career with the Royal Shakespeare Company, in productions including Nicholas Nickleby (1980), A Midsummer Night's Dream (1981), as Helena in All's Well That Ends Well (1981), The Castle (1985), Dasha in A Question of Geography, Viola in Twelfth Night (1988), Masha in Three Sisters (1988), The Duchess of Malfi (1989), Macbeth (1999) and Much Ado about Nothing (2002). She returned to the RSC in 2015 to play Linda Loman in Death of a Salesman, directed by Gregory Doran.

She was made an associate artist of the Royal Shakespeare Company in 1987. Her other theatre work includes Three Birds Alighting on a Field (1991), Arcadia (1993), Hedda Gabler (1996), Ivanov (1997) and Mary Stuart (2005).

In New York, she made her Broadway debut in 1983, when the RSC production of All's Well That Ends Well transferred there. In 1993 she starred as Biddy in the Off-Broadway production of Three Birds Alighting on a Field, for which she received a Drama Desk Award nomination. She returned to the Broadway stage in 2009 when she and Janet McTeer reprised their roles in Mary Stuart. In 2014 Walter starred as Brutus in an all-female production of Julius Caesar Off-Broadway and received her second Drama Desk nomination.

Her films include Sense and Sensibility (1995), Bedrooms and Hallways (1998), The Governess (1998), Onegin (1999), Villa des Roses (2002) and Bright Young Things (2003). On television, in 1987, she portrayed Lord Peter Wimsey's love interest Harriet Vane for three instalments of the BBC's A Dorothy L. Sayers Mystery, played Detective Inspector Natalie Chandler from 2009 to 2012 in the ITV drama series Law & Order: UK. Other TV roles include Annie Keel in the 2001 series Waking the Dead, Mrs. Gowan in the 2008 BBC adaptation of Little Dorrit, Clare in A Short Stay in Switzerland (2009) and Lady Shackleton in four episodes of the series Downton Abbey (2013–15). In 2016, she played Clementine Churchill on the Netflix series The Crown, and in 2017, appeared in two episodes of the BBC drama Call the Midwife as Sister Ursula.

She is also a patron of several notable charities; the Shakespeare Schools Festival, a charity that enables school children across the UK to perform Shakespeare in professional theatres, Prisoners Abroad, a charity that supports the welfare of Britons imprisoned overseas and their families and Clean Break, a charity and theatre company dedicated to sharing the often hidden stories of imprisoned women, and to transforming the lives of women offenders and—through theatre education—of women at risk of offending.

Walter played Brutus in Julius Caesar in 2012, and the title role in Henry IV in 2014, in all-female productions at the Donmar Warehouse. Both productions transferred to Brooklyn's St. Ann's Warehouse in New York. She was set to reprise both roles, as well as playing Prospero in an all-female production of The Tempest, as part of director Phyllida Lloyd's Shakespeare trilogy at the Donmar's temporary, in-the-round, 420-seat theatre next to King's Cross station in 2016.

On 19 August 2019 Deadline reported that Walter would be joining the cast of the BBC America and AMC series Killing Eve. Walter played Dasha, a Russian exile and former Olympics gymnastics champion who trained Villanelle in assassination.

Personal life 
Walter's partner from 1996 until his death in 2004 was actor Peter Blythe. In 2009, she met actor Guy Paul. They married in May 2011.

Filmography

Film

Television

Theatre 
 notable performances 

 1979, Royal Shakespeare Company, A Midsummer Night's Dream
 1981/82, Royal Shakespeare Company, Helena in All's Well That Ends Well
 1987/88, Royal Shakespeare Company, Imogen in Cymbeline
 1987/88, Royal Shakespeare Company, Viola in Twelfth Night
 1987/88, Royal Shakespeare Company, Dacha in A Question of Geography
 1988, Royal Shakespeare Company, Masha in Chekhov's Three Sisters
 1989/90, Royal Shakespeare Company, Duchess in John Webster's The Duchess of Malfi
 1991, Royal Court Theatre (and Broadway transfer), Biddy in Timberlake Wertenbaker's Three Birds Alighting on a Field
 1993, Royal National Theatre, Lady Croom in Arcadia by Tom Stoppard
 1999 Royal Shakespeare Company, Lady Macbeth in Macbeth
 2002 Royal National Theatre Paige in Dinner by Moira Buffini, co-starring Nicholas Farrell and Catherine McCormack
 2005, Donmar Warehouse and West End, Mary Stuart by Schiller
 2006, Royal Shakespeare Company, Antony and Cleopatra
 2009, Mary Stuart, Broadway transfer
 2010, Royal National Theatre, Women Beware Women
 2012/13 Donmar Warehouse, Brutus in Julius Caesar
 2014, Donmar Warehouse, King Henry IV in Henry IV.
 2015, Royal Shakespeare Company and the Noël Coward Theatre, Linda Loman in Death of a Salesman
 2016, Donmar Warehouse, Prospero in The Tempest.

Radio 
 Jeremy Hardy Speaks to the Nation
 The Vortex by Noël Coward, BBC Radio 3, 2 January 2000, as Florence Lancaster
 Scenes of Seduction, radio play written by Timberlake Wertenbaker and directed by Ned Chaillet, broadcast on BBC Radio 4 7 March 2005 – Catherine.
 Desmond Olivier Dingle (as herself), broadcast on BBC7 on 28 February 2007, episode 2 of 6, duration 30 minutes
 The Arts and How they was done (as herself), broadcast on BBC Radio 4 between 4 April and 9 May 2007, episodes 1 and 6 out of 6, duration 30 minutes
 I, Claudius, broadcast on BBC Radio 4 December 2010 – Livia, wife of Augustus.
 Guest in Desert Island Discs on BBC Radio 4 on 26 June 2011.
 Time and the Conways as Mrs. Conway in BBC Radio 3's adaptation of J.B. Priestley's play, broadcast on 14 September 2014.

Honours 
She was appointed Commander of the Order of the British Empire (CBE) in the 2000 New Year Honours and promoted to Dame Commander of the Order of the British Empire (DBE) in the 2011 New Year Honours for services to drama.

In 2001 she and Kenneth Branagh were both given honorary doctorates and honorary fellowships at the Shakespeare Institute in Stratford.

Her performance in Mary Stuart at the Donmar Warehouse transferred to Broadway, where it was nominated for numerous Tony Awards, including Best Actress nods for her and her co-star Janet McTeer.

Bibliography 
 Clamorous Voices: Shakespeare's Women Today (1988). Women's Press, .
 Players of Shakespeare 3 (1994). Cambridge University Press, .
 Macbeth (Actors on Shakespeare) (2002). Faber and Faber, London. 
 Other People's Shoes (2003). Nick Hern Books, London. . Autobiography.
 Facing It, Reflections on Images of Older Women (2010). Self Published, London. 
 Brutus and Other Heroines: Playing Shakespeare's Roles for Women (2016). Nick Hern Books, London.

References

External links 
 
 Company Members : Harriet Walter at the Royal National Theatre
 Official website
 Facingitpublications.co.uk

1950 births
20th-century English actresses
21st-century English actresses
Living people
Alumni of the London Academy of Music and Dramatic Art
Audiobook narrators
Dames Commander of the Order of the British Empire
English film actresses
English radio actresses
English stage actresses
English television actresses
English voice actresses
English women writers
Laurence Olivier Award winners
Actresses from London
Royal Shakespeare Company members
English Shakespearean actresses
Actresses awarded damehoods
People educated at Cranborne Chase School
Walter family